Aukštaitian is one of the dialects of the Lithuanian language, spoken in the ethnographic regions of Aukštaitija, Dzūkija and Suvalkija. It became the basis for the standard Lithuanian language.

Classification

Revised classification of the dialects, proposed in 1965 by linguists Zigmas Zinkevičius and Aleksas Girdenis, divides the Aukštaitian dialect into three sub-dialects based on pronunciation of the mixed diphthongs an, am, en, em and the ogonek vowels ą and ę:

Western Aukštaitianmost similar to standard Lithuanianpreserves both the diphthongs and the vowels. It is further subdivided into two sub-dialects:
 The Kaunas sub-dialect is spoken mostly in Suvalkija. This sub-dialect separates long and short vowels pretty well and properly stresses word endings.
 The Šiauliai sub-dialect is spoken in a strip between Samogitia and Aukštaitija. This sub-dialect almost always shortens unaccented long vowels (dumẽlis instead of dūmelis – little smoke, vãgis instead of vagys – thieves, lãpu instead of lapų – leaves) and moves accent mark from the end of the word (ràsa instead of rasà – dew, tỹliu instead of tyliù – I am silent, žmònos instead of žmonõs – wives').

Southern Aukštaitian preserves the diphthong, but replaces ą and ę with ų and į (žųsis instead of žąsis – goose, skįsta instead of skęsta – drowns). It is spoken mostly in Dzūkija and therefore is known as the Dzūkian dialect.

Eastern Aukštaitian replaces the diphthongs with either un, um, in, im or on, om, ėn, ėm (pasumda instead of pasamdo – hiring, romstis instead of ramstis – support). The ogonek vowels are replaced with either ų, į or o, ę/ė (grųštas or groštas instead of grąžtas – drill, grįšt instead of gręžti – to drill). It is spoken mostly in Aukštaitija. It is further subdivided into six sub-dialects.

References

Sources
 

Lithuanian dialects